Dun An-ning (born 1956), also known as Danny Dun, is a Taiwanese actor, director, and screenwriter.

Early life 
In 1956, Dun was born as Dun An-ning in Taiwan.

Filmography

Films

TV Dramas (incomplete)

References

External links

 

1956 births
Living people
Taiwanese male film actors
Taiwanese male television actors
20th-century Taiwanese male actors
21st-century Taiwanese male actors
Taiwanese film directors
Taiwanese television directors